Terrence William Boyle (born December 22, 1945) is a United States district judge of the United States District Court for the Eastern District of North Carolina. He was Chief Judge of that court from 1997 to 2004. He served a second term as Chief Judge from 2018 to 2021. From 1991 to 1993 and again from 2001 to 2007, he was a nominee to the United States Court of Appeals for the Fourth Circuit. His federal appellate nomination from 2001 to 2007 is the longest in history not to be acted upon by the United States Senate.

Education and career 

Born in Passaic, New Jersey, Boyle received a Bachelor of Arts degree from Brown University in 1967 and a Juris Doctor from the Washington College of Law at American University in 1970. From 1970 to 1973, he was the minority counsel of the Housing Subcommittee of the U.S. House of Representatives Committee on Banking and Currency. In 1973, he was a legislative assistant to Republican Senator Jesse Helms of North Carolina. He was in private practice in Elizabeth City, North Carolina from 1974 to 1984.

Federal judicial service 

Boyle was nominated by President Ronald Reagan on April 4, 1984, to a seat on the United States District Court for the Eastern District of North Carolina vacated by Judge Franklin Taylor Dupree Jr. He was confirmed by the United States Senate on April 24, 1984, and received commission on May 3, 1984. He served as Chief Judge from 1997 to 2004. He served as Chief Judge once again from 2018 to 2021.

First Fourth Circuit nomination 

On October 22, 1991, Boyle was nominated by US President George H. W. Bush to a newly-created seat on the United States Court of Appeals for the Fourth Circuit, but his nomination was not acted upon by the Senate, which was controlled by the Democrats. His nomination was allowed to lapse at the end of Bush's presidency.

Fourth Circuit controversies 

On December 24, 1995, in the hope of integrating the Fourth Circuit, US President Bill Clinton nominated James A. Beaty Jr., an African-American judge of the United States District Court for the Middle District of North Carolina, to a Fourth Circuit seat vacated by Judge James Dickson  Phillips Jr. in 1994, when he took senior status. Almost immediately, Beaty's nomination ran into opposition from Jesse Helms, who was angry that Clinton had refused to renominate Boyle to the Fourth Circuit. Beaty's nomination was ultimately unsuccessful because of Helms's opposition.

On May 9, 2001, Boyle was renominated by President George W. Bush to the Fourth Circuit, this time to the seat vacated by Phillips Jr, but his nomination was never brought to a vote on the floor of the Senate. For over five years, the nomination was stalled, the longest federal appeals court nomination that was never given a full Senate vote.

His nomination was adamantly opposed by the Democratic Party from the beginning. Democratic Senator John Edwards claimed Boyle was an opponent of civil rights and disabilities legislation. Boyle's supporters viewed him as the victim of political payback and obstruction because of his ties to Helms, who had derailed several judicial nominations by Clinton because of Boyle.

In March 2005, after Bush's re-election and an increased Republican Party Senate majority, the Senate Judiciary Committee gave Boyle a hearing, almost a full four years after his nomination. On June 16, 2005, Boyle was voted out of Committee on a 10-8 party line vote.

In April 2006, Senate Majority Leader Bill Frist said he would try to schedule a vote in May on the nomination of Boyle. No vote occurred, however; with the Democrats taking over the US Senate in the 110th Congress, Boyle's confirmation chances markedly decreased. On January 9, 2007, the White House announced that it would not renominate Boyle. At the time, Boyle clearly stated he did not voluntarily withdraw his nomination.

On July 17, 2007, US President George W. Bush nominated United States District Court Judge Robert J. Conrad, to the Phillips seat; Conrad's nomination was also unsuccessful.

See also
 George H.W. Bush judicial appointment controversies
 George W. Bush judicial appointment controversies

References

External links
 
 U.S. Department of Justice Profile

1945 births
Living people
Washington College of Law alumni
Brown University alumni
People from Passaic, New Jersey
Judges of the United States District Court for the Eastern District of North Carolina
United States district court judges appointed by Ronald Reagan
20th-century American judges
North Carolina Republicans
People from Elizabeth City, North Carolina
21st-century American judges